Afaq Ahmed (born 7 January 1990) is a Pakistani first-class cricketer who played for the National Bank of Pakistan and Peshawar from 2009 to 2016. He played in 39 first-class matches, taking 135 wickets.

References

External links
 

1990 births
Living people
Pakistani cricketers
National Bank of Pakistan cricketers
Peshawar cricketers
People from Malakand District